Josef Matějček (1901–?) was a weightlifter from Czechoslovakia. He competed at the 1928 Summer Olympics in the lightweight category and finished in 11th place.  In the 1930s–1940s he worked as a national weightlifting coach and sports functionary.

References

External links

1901 births
Olympic weightlifters of Czechoslovakia
Weightlifters at the 1928 Summer Olympics
Czechoslovak male weightlifters
Year of death missing
Place of death missing